Drayton Florence, Jr. (born December 19, 1980) is a former American football cornerback who played eleven seasons in the National Football League. He was drafted by the San Diego Chargers in the second round of the 2003 NFL Draft. He played college football at Tennessee-Chattanooga and Tuskegee.

Florence was also a member of the: Carolina Panthers, Detroit Lions, Jacksonville Jaguars, Buffalo Bills, and Denver Broncos.

College career 
Florence attended Tuskegee University. He was inducted into Tuskegee University Hall Of Fame in 2014 (2001–2002) after transferring from the University of Tennessee at Chattanooga (1999–2000). He registered school-record three returns for touchdowns on interceptions at Tuskegee. As a senior, he was named first-team Division II All-America by the Associated Press and American Coaches Association. Florence is the highest drafted player to enter the NFL from Tuskegee University. Florence finished his degree at the University of North Florida with a bachelor's degree in sport management.

Professional career

2003 NFL Draft 

Florence was drafted by the Chargers 46th overall in the second round of the 2003 NFL Draft and was the 2nd cornerback selected by Chargers that draft after Sammy Davis. He is the highest drafted NFL player from Tuskegee University.

San Diego Chargers 
Initially drafted as a nickel back who could fill in at safety if needed, Florence had fought his way to become a legitimate starting cornerback in the NFL across Quentin Jammer.

2007 playoffs 
On Sunday, January 14, 2007 in the AFC Divisional Playoff game against the New England Patriots after a muffed punt by wide receiver Eric Parker at the San Diego 31-yard line, Florence committed a personal foul, head-butting Patriot TE Daniel Graham following a 3rd and long play. During the play, the Charger defense had stopped the Patriots for a 7-yard loss putting the ball at the Charger 37-yard line (apx. 53-yard field goal range).  The result of the penalty was a Patriots first down on the Charger 18.  The extension of the drive led to a Stephen Gostkowski 34 yard field goal. The Patriots went on to win the game 24-21.

The NFL fined Florence $15,000 for the illegal hit he put on Houston Texans Quarterback Matt Schaub on Sunday October 28. On an interception return, he drilled Schaub from the blind side, and was penalized 15 yards for unnecessary roughness. The league ruled that on a change of possession, Florence unnecessarily made helmet-to-helmet contact with Schaub, who suffered a concussion and missed the rest of the game.

Jacksonville Jaguars 
On March 1, 2008, Florence was signed by the Jacksonville Jaguars to a six-year $36 million contract with $13 million in guaranteed money. After one season with the team he was released on February 11, 2009.

Buffalo Bills 
On March 3, 2009, Florence was signed by the Buffalo Bills. Florence made the starting rotation under Head Coach Dick Jauron. Florence responded by leading the Bills in takeaways, including a fumble returned for a touchdown against the Bengals and an interception returned for a touchdown against Minnesota, two weeks apart.  He also scored the go-ahead touchdown in the Bills' victory against the New England Patriots in 2011.

On July 27, 2011, Florence re-signed with the Bills for 3 years at a total contract value of $15 million. On May 4, 2012, Florence was released.

Denver Broncos 
Florence signed with the Denver Broncos on May 10, 2012 and released on Aug, 31, 2012.

Detroit Lions 
Florence signed with the Detroit Lions on September 2, 2012.

Carolina Panthers 
Florence signed with the Carolina Panthers on March 13, 2013, expecting to bring his veteran experience to help the young Panthers secondary.

On August 31, 2013, he was cut by the Panthers. He was later re-signed to their roster on September 19, 2013.

Detroit Lions 
On August 7, 2014, he signed with the Detroit Lions. He was later released on August 19, 2014.

On May 1, 2015, he retired from the NFL and graduated from the University of North Florida with a bachelor's degree in Sports Management.

NFL career statistics

Personal life 
He is the cousin of Chicago Rush wide receiver Carlos Wright.

References

External links 
Buffalo Bills bio

1980 births
Living people
Sportspeople from Ocala, Florida
Players of American football from Florida
African-American players of American football
American football cornerbacks
Tuskegee Golden Tigers football players
San Diego Chargers players
Jacksonville Jaguars players
Buffalo Bills players
Denver Broncos players
Detroit Lions players
Carolina Panthers players
21st-century African-American sportspeople
20th-century African-American people